Louis Clarke may refer to

 Louis Clarke (athlete)
 Louis Clarke (antiquarian)
 Louis Semple Clarke

See also
 Louis Clark (disambiguation)
 Lewis Clark (disambiguation)